Secular Progressive Alliance, formerly known as Democratic Progressive Alliance, is an alliance of Indian political parties formed by the Dravida Munnetra Kazhagam (DMK).

History 
The alliance was known as the Democratic Progressive Alliance 2006–2009 and 2014–2016. It became the Secular Progressive Alliance in 2021.

Withdrawals
The Left parties defected to the All India Anna Dravida Munnetra Kazhagam (AIADMK)-led front in 2009 after it withdrew support to the Congress-led United Progressive Alliance coalition in the Centre.

The Pattali Makkal Katchi withdrew support in 2008 over differences with the DMK but it still remained in the Congress-led UPA in the Centre. But after differences of seat sharing before the 15th Lok Sabha, it withdrew support to the UPA also and crossed over to the AIADMK-led front.

The Manithaneya Makkal Katchi was formed in 2009 by the Tamil Nadu Muslim Munnetra Kazagham and immediately joined the DPA. But before the Lok Sabha elections, its demand for two Lok Sabha seats and one Rajya Sabha seat was turned down by the DMK who offered them a lone Lok Sabha seat. The MMK withdrew from the DPA and as of now tied up with small parties like actor Sarath Kumar-led Akila Indiya Samathuva Makkal Katchi, the Puthiya Tamilzhagam and the Bharatiya Janata Party (BJP).

Members

16th Assembly of Tamil Nadu

Ministries
 Fifth Karunanidhi ministry (2006 - 2011)
 M. K. Stalin ministry (2021- incumbent)

References 

Political party alliances in India
Political parties in Tamil Nadu
2006 establishments in Tamil Nadu
Political parties established in 2006